Ken Flach and Robert Seguso were the defending champions but lost in the semifinals to John Fitzgerald and Anders Järryd.

Fitzgerald and Järryd defeated Rick Leach and Jim Pugh in the final, 3–6, 7–6(7–4), 6–4, 7–6(7–4) to win the gentlemen's doubles title at the 1989 Wimbledon Championships.

Seeds

  Rick Leach /  Jim Pugh (final)
  Ken Flach /  Robert Seguso (semifinals)
  John Fitzgerald /  Anders Järryd (champions)
  Jim Grabb /  Patrick McEnroe (third round)
  Jakob Hlasek /  John McEnroe (third round)
  Paul Annacone /  Christo van Rensburg (first round)
  Kevin Curren /  David Pate (third round)
  Jorge Lozano /  Todd Witsken (first round)
  Darren Cahill /  Mark Kratzmann (quarterfinals)
  Pieter Aldrich /  Danie Visser (quarterfinals)
  Scott Davis /  Tim Wilkison (second round)
  Peter Doohan /  Laurie Warder (quarterfinals)
  Eric Jelen /  Michael Mortensen (first round)
  Grant Connell /  Glenn Michibata (first round)
  Jim Courier /  Pete Sampras (third round)
  Brad Drewett /  Wally Masur (second round)

Qualifying

Draw

Finals

Top half

Section 1

Section 2

Bottom half

Section 3

Section 4

References

External links

1989 Wimbledon Championships – Men's draws and results at the International Tennis Federation

Men's Doubles
Wimbledon Championship by year – Men's doubles